Baladiyah Al-Irqah, also known by its English name Irqah Sub-Municipality, is a baladiyah and one of the 16 sub-municipalities of Riyadh, Saudi Arabia. Since the emancipation of the Diplomatic Quarter district from its jurisdiction in November 2018, it includes 4 neighborhoods and is responsible for their planning and development.

References 

Baladiyahs of Riyadh
2018 establishments in Saudi Arabia